Midnight Molly is a 1925 American silent drama film directed by Lloyd Ingraham and starring Evelyn Brent in a dual role. A print of the film exists in the BFI National Archive.

Plot
As described in a review in a film magazine, Midnight Molly (Brent), female their, surprised by detectives as she is stealing a painting, escapes but is rundown by an automobile and is taken to the hospital. Margaret (Brent), wife of District Attorney John Warren (Gordon), elopes with adventurer George Calvin (Bary). John is called to he hospital and finds that Molly is the double of his wife. Hoping to avert a scandal, he takes her to his home. Molly recovers and keeps up the deception. John runs for governor. Calvin hears of this and, seeing a chance for blackmail, returns. Detective Daley is suspicious of Molly and hopes to trap her by taking her fingerprints. However, Daley's stoolpigeon squeals on his plans. Molly goes to Margaret and forces her to come to the Warren house and be fingerprinted, saving the situation. Margaret and Calvin are later killed, and John and Molly are married.

Cast
 Evelyn Brent as Margaret Warren / Midnight Molly
 John T. Dillon as Daley (credited as John Dillon)
 Bruce Gordon as John Warren
 Léon Bary as George Calvin (as Leon Barry)
 John Gough as Fogarty

References

External links

1925 films
1925 drama films
Silent American drama films
American silent feature films
American black-and-white films
Films directed by Lloyd Ingraham
Film Booking Offices of America films
1920s American films